There have been various uprisings by Huilliche people through history. While the specifics vary, all of these uprisings were against the Spanish colonial order. 

Mapuche uprising of 1598–1604 in which Huilliches succeeded in destroying Osorno in 1604.
Huilliche uprising of 1712 in Chiloé Archipelago
Huilliche uprising of 1792 in Río Bueno